These are the results of the rhythmic group all-around competition, one of the two events of the rhythmic gymnastics discipline contested in the gymnastics at the 2000 Summer Olympics in Sydney.

Qualification

Ten national teams, each composed by six gymnasts, competed in the group all-around event in the rhythmic gymnastics qualification round.
The eight highest scoring teams advanced to the final.

Final

References

http://www.gymnasticsresults.com/olympics/og2000rg.html#gf
http://www.la84foundation.org/5va/reports.htm

Women's rhythmic group all-around
2000
2000 in women's gymnastics
Women's events at the 2000 Summer Olympics